John Findlay (March 31, 1766November 5, 1838) was an American politician and served two terms as a member of the U.S. House of Representatives from Pennsylvania's 5th congressional district.

Biography
John Findlay was born in Mercersburg in the Province of Pennsylvania as the oldest son of Samuel Findlay and Jane (née Smith). His younger brothers were William Findlay and James Findlay. All three brothers became politicians, serving at national, state and local levels. William served two terms as governor of Pennsylvania, and James served as mayor of Cincinnati before the War of 1812, and later as US Representative, from 1825-1833.

Findlay served as a prothonotary from 1809 to 1821. He served as a captain in the War of 1812. He moved to Chambersburg, Pennsylvania, where he served as a register and recorder of deeds, generally considered an advantageous appointment. He later was appointed as a clerk of the orphans’ court and clerk of the court of quarter sessions, serving from 1809 to 1818.

Findlay joined the Republican Party. He won a special election to the Seventeenth Congress to fill the vacancy caused by the resignation of James Duncan.  He was reelected as a Jackson Republican to the Eighteenth Congress and elected as a Jacksonian to the Nineteenth Congress.

He was not a candidate for renomination in 1826. Appointed as US postmaster of Chambersburg on March 20, 1829, he served until his death there in 1838. He was buried in Falling Spring Presbyterian Church Cemetery at Chambersburg.

Notes

Sources

The Political Graveyard

External links

American military personnel of the War of 1812
Presbyterians from Pennsylvania
1766 births
1838 deaths
Pennsylvania postmasters
People from Mercersburg, Pennsylvania
Democratic-Republican Party members of the United States House of Representatives from Pennsylvania
Jacksonian members of the United States House of Representatives from Pennsylvania
19th-century American politicians
People of colonial Pennsylvania